Maurice Lampaert (25 February 1896 – 22 November 1976) was a Belgian racing cyclist. He rode in the 1920 Tour de France.

References

1896 births
1976 deaths
Belgian male cyclists
Place of birth missing